Women of Passion is a 1926 German silent film directed by Rolf Randolf and starring Fern Andra, Ágnes Esterházy, and Henry Bender.

The film's sets were designed by Robert A. Dietrich.

Cast

References

Bibliography

External links

1926 films
Films of the Weimar Republic
German silent feature films
Films directed by Rolf Randolf
German black-and-white films